Sutton Weaver is a civil parish in Cheshire West and Chester, England.  It is largely rural, and contains the village of Sutton Weaver.  The parish is traversed in a north–south direction by the M56 motorway, the A56 road, and the Chester to Manchester Line, and from east to west by the River Weaver and the Weaver Navigation, and the A533 road.  It contains twelve buildings that are recorded in the National Heritage List for England as designated listed buildings.  Of these one is listed at Grade I, another at Grade II*, and the other ten at Grade II.  The structures include houses, farm buildings, and bridges.  Most of them are houses or farm buildings, but there is also a bridge and two viaducts.

Key

Buildings

References
Citations

Sources

Listed buildings in Cheshire West and Chester
Lists of listed buildings in Cheshire